Jemal "Jimmy" Tabidze (born 18 March 1996) is a Georgian professional footballer who plays as centre-back for Erovnuli Liga club Dinamo Tbilisi and the Georgia national team.

Club career
After beginning his career in Pirveli Liga with FC Saburtalo Tbilisi, he joined the Belgian club K.A.A. Gent in July 2015. He played for the reserves team, not making any first-team appearances.

On 14 February 2017, he joined the Russian Premier League club FC Ural Yekaterinburg on loan until the end of the 2016–17 season.

On 1 July 2017, he signed a long-term contract with FC Ufa. On 30 March 2022, Tabidze terminated his contract with Ufa by mutual consent.

On 11 June 2022, Tabidze returned to Belgium and signed a two-year contract with Kortrijk. On 15 July 2022, his contract with Kortrijk was terminated by mutual consent before the season started, with the club explaining it by lack of match fitness, allowing Tabidze to join FC Dinamo Tbilisi.

International
He made his debut for the Georgia national football team on 23 January 2017 in a friendly against Uzbekistan.

International goals
Scores and results list Georgia's goal tally first.

Career statistics

External links

References

1996 births
People from Samtredia
Living people
Footballers from Georgia (country)
Association football defenders
Georgia (country) youth international footballers
Georgia (country) under-21 international footballers
Georgia (country) international footballers
FC Ufa players
FC Ural Yekaterinburg players
K.V. Kortrijk players
FC Dinamo Tbilisi players
Russian Premier League players
Erovnuli Liga players
Expatriate footballers from Georgia (country)
Expatriate footballers in Belgium
Expatriate sportspeople from Georgia (country) in Belgium
Expatriate footballers in Russia
Expatriate sportspeople from Georgia (country) in Russia